Double-A (officially Class AA) is the second-highest level of play in Minor League Baseball in the United States since 1946, below only Triple-A. There are currently 30 teams classified at the Double-A level, one for each team in Major League Baseball, organized into three leagues: the Eastern League, the Southern League, and the Texas League.

History

Class AA ("Double-A") was established in 1912, as the new highest classification of Minor League Baseball. Previously, Class A had been the highest level, predating the establishment of the National Association of Professional Baseball Leagues—the formal name of Minor League Baseball—in 1901. Entering the 1912 season, three leagues were designated as Class AA:
 American Association (AA)
 International League (IL)
 Pacific Coast League (PCL)

Each of these leagues had previously been in Class A. Each remained in Class AA through 1945, then moved into Class AAA ("Triple-A") when it was established in 1946. No other leagues were designated Class AA during 1912–1945, although a Class A1 level (between Class A and Class AA) was established in 1936.

The contemporary Double-A classification, as the second-highest level in Minor League Baseball, was established in 1946. Entering that season, the three aforementioned leagues in Class AA all moved to the newly established Triple-A, and Class A1 became Double-A with two leagues:
 Southern Association, previously Class A1 (1936–1945)
 Texas League, previously Class A1 (1936–1942; idle for three seasons during World War II)

The Texas League remained in Double-A for the next 75 years. During this time, there were limited changes to leagues at the Double-A level:
 1955: the Mexican League, previously independent, was classified as Double-A
 1961: final season of the Southern Association
 1963: the Eastern League and original South Atlantic League were moved from Class A to Double-A
 1964: the original South Atlantic League was reconstituted as the Southern League
 1967: the Mexican League moved to Triple-A

Entering the 2020 minor league season (which was not played, due to the COVID-19 pandemic) the Texas League had been in Double-A since 1946, the Eastern League since 1963, and the Southern League since 1964. Prior to the 2021 season, Major League Baseball (MLB) reorganized the minor leagues. At that time, the existing leagues were temporarily renamed: Eastern League as Double-A Northeast, Southern League as Double-A South, and Texas League as Double-A Central. Following MLB's acquisition of the rights to the names of the historical minor leagues, MLB announced on March 16, 2022, that the leagues would revert to their prior names, effective with the 2022 season.

System

The Double-A classification usually hosts developing players that have been part of professional baseball for only a couple of years. These players can get to the Double-A level by earning a promotion from any of the lower-level leagues, with Class A-Advanced ("High-A") being immediately below Double-A in the minor league hierarchy.

The step up to the Double-A level can be one of the hardest promotions for such players because it is the level at which pitchers need to have a good off-speed pitch in their repertoires. In addition, it is the level where fastball-only hitters need to learn how to hit off-speed pitches, or their hopes of advancing to the majors will diminish. Some players may be placed in Double-A to begin their minor league careers, usually veterans from foreign leagues or top prospects out of college. Additionally, major league clubs sometimes send players to their Double-A team to rehabilitate from injuries.

While Triple-A is the highest level in the minor leagues, players may also advance to the major leagues directly from Double-A. For example, within the Toronto Blue Jays organization, 17 position players were promoted from Double-A directly to MLB during 1978–2018; approximately one player every two seasons. As players at the Double-A level are, generally, still improving their skills, it could be argued that the pure talent level is higher in Double-A than Triple-A, where there may be some stagnation of talent.

Because players are not moving back and forth from the major leagues at this level, as often happens in Triple-A, the rosters tend to be more stable. Fans of Double-A teams have a longer amount of time to get acquainted with the players, which helps create a better relationship between the team and its fans.

Current teams

Texas League

Eastern League

Southern League

Playoffs
Prior to the 2021 reorganization of the minor leagues, all three active Double-A leagues played split seasons, with the Eastern League moving to that system in 2019. Teams winning their division in either half of the season qualified for the postseason, with wild card teams filling out the remaining spots in a bracket tournament, usually composed of four teams.

On June 30, 2021, Minor League Baseball announced that the top two teams in each league (based on full-season winning percentage, and regardless of division) would meet in a best-of-five postseason series to determine league champions.

All-Star Games
Prior to the 2021 reorganization of the minor leagues, each of the active Double-a leagues held its own midseason All-Star Game. From 1991 to 2002, the three combined to hold the Double-A All-Star Game between teams of American League-affiliated All-Stars and National League-affiliated All-Stars.

After the start of the 2021 minor league season was delayed by a month, team schedules were released without a break for an all-star game.

Awards

Pace-of-play initiatives
As a part of pace-of-play initiatives implemented in 2015, 20-second pitch clocks entered use at Double-A stadiums in 2015. In 2018, the time was shortened to 15 seconds when no runners are on base. Other significant changes implemented in 2018 included beginning extra innings with a runner on second base and limiting teams to eight mound visits during a nine-inning game. In 2019, the number of mound visits was reduced to seven, and pitchers were required to face a minimum of three consecutive batters, unless the side is retired or the pitcher is injured and unable to continue.

See also
List of Double-A baseball stadiums

References

External links
 

Minor league baseball
Texas League